Mariusz Puszakowski (born 25 May 1978) is a former speedway rider from Poland.

Speedway career
He rode in the top tier of British Speedway riding for the Ipswich Witches during the 2005 Elite League speedway season and Arena Essex Hammers during the 2006 Elite League speedway season. During the 2006 season he broke his leg in a league match, which ultimately led to his retirement on medical advice.

References 

1978 births
Living people
Polish speedway riders
Lakeside Hammers riders
Ipswich Witches riders